The Tidewater Lock is a dam in Washington, D.C. to the west of the mouth of Rock Creek at the Potomac River, on the east side of Georgetown.  Built to connect the Chesapeake and Ohio Canal, opened in 1831, with the Potomac, it was a busy maritime intersection during several decades of the canal's heyday. C&O documents refer to it variously as Lock 0 and Tide Lock A. 

Canal documents sometimes list a "Tide Lock B" on section "I" which stood at the lockhouse at 17th and Constitution Ave NW. It was completed in 1834.

Today, the lock marks Milestone 0 of the National Park Service's Chesapeake & Ohio Canal trail.

Gallery

See also
 Locks on the C&O Canal

References

Chesapeake and Ohio Canal
Dams in Washington, D.C.
Georgetown (Washington, D.C.)
Publicly owned dams